Rūrutu is the northernmost island in the Austral archipelago of French Polynesia, and the name of a commune consisting solely of that island. It is 10.8 km long and 5.3 km wide. At the 2017 census it had a population of 2,466.

Geologically, Rurutu was initially formed 12 million years ago by the Macdonald hotspot, a hotspot associated with the Macdonald seamount.  Over the next 10 million years, erosion shrank the island until it was almost an atoll.  Then, just over a million years ago, Rurutu passed over the Arago hotspot, which lifted it roughly 150 meters.  Steep sea cliffs of ancient coral lifted by the event — called makatea — now largely encircle the island.  These are riddled with caves filled with concretions — indeed, Rurutu is largely unique among islands in French Polynesia in that its historic inhabitants were cave-dwelling.

Because it is endowed with a fringing reef, Rurutu has in recent years become known for whale watching: Humpback whales come and reproduce here between July and October within easy sighting distance from the beach.

Although its tiny community still subsists primarily on fishing and basic agriculture, tourism has been a growing industry, especially since François Mitterrand's visit in 1990.  Whale watching season sees the bulk of tourists, but the largely untouched native culture, the white sand beaches, and the lush tropical flora draw small numbers of tourists year-round.

Administration
The commune of Rurutu consists of the island of Rurutu, and is subdivided into the following associated communes:
 Avera
 Hauti
 Moerai

Notable people
Teuruarii IV, last king of Rurutu

See also
Rurutu Airport
Statue of A'a from Rurutu

References

External links

   Natural and cultural heritage of Rurutu on Tahiti Heritage with Google maps

Islands of the Austral Islands
Communes of French Polynesia